Frances Jewett Gulick (April 6, 1891 – November 29, 1936) was an American Y.W.C.A. welfare worker who was awarded a United States Army citation for valor and courage on the field during the aerial bombardment of Varmaise, Oise, France in World War I. She was attached to the First Engineers in Europe, and was operating a canteen at the time. She was pictured with 3 overseas service stripes on her sleeve, which represents at least 18 months of service.

Biography
Frances Jewett Gulick was born April 6, 1891 in Springfield, Massachusetts. Her mother was Charlotte Emily "Lottie" (Vetter) Gulick. Her father Luther Halsey Gulick Jr., M.D. designed the Y.M.C.A. logo. Her great-grandfather was Peter Johnson Gulick (1796–1877), an early missionary to the Kingdom of Hawaii.

Her army citation read as follows:

Miss Frances Gulick, Y.W.C.A. (attached to 1st U.S. Engineers) welfare worker, who has displayed the finest qualities of energy, courage and devotion in the discharge of her duties throughout the war and occupation of hostile territory, notably during the aerial bombardment at Vernaise, May 30, 1918, where, in spite of many casualties in the town, she remained at her post. From then until the division was relieved in July, 1918, Miss Gulick, with total disregard for her own personal safety, continued to operate her canteen, although the town was shelled and bombed at different times by the enemy, and her canteen itself struck.

She died November 29, 1936 in New York City.

Family tree

References

External links
 

YMCA leaders
American women in World War I
1891 births
1936 deaths
American expatriates in France
20th-century American people